Tunde Owolabi (born 26 July 1995) is a Belgian professional footballer who plays as a striker for League of Ireland Premier Division club Cork City.

Early and personal life
Owolabi's Nigerian father Ganiyu was also a professional footballer. He was born and raised in Antwerp, where his father was playing at the time for Royal Antwerp. Owolabi played for Belgian club Royal Cappellen's under 17 side before the family moved to England in 2012, when he was 18 years old.

Career
Owolabi played for the FC United of Manchester development team during the 2013–14 season. He played for New Mills, moving from them to Hyde United in February 2017. By December 2017 he had played for Prescot Cables (twice), Stalybridge Celtic and Glossop North End. After moving to Skelmersdale United in February 2018, without scoring in 10 games, he then played for Radcliffe, scoring 26 goals in the 2018–19 season, which earned him the Supporters Player Award from the Northern Premier League Player Awards. He left Radcliffe in the summer of 2019 to move to Malta, to join Victoria Hotspurs before returning to England later that summer, signing with FC United of Manchester in August 2019. He signed a new contract with the club in November 2019. He scored 35 goals in 41 games in all competitions for the club during the 2019–20 season.

He signed a one-year contract with Scottish club Hamilton Academical in July 2020, having previously been linked with a transfer to Grimsby Town. He made his professional debut for Hamilton on 8 August 2020 in a Scottish Premier League match against Ross County. On 1 February 2021, Owolabi was released by Hamilton alongside team mate Justin Johnson, via mutual consent.

On 7 March 2021, Owolabi signed a one-year deal with Irish club Finn Harps. He scored a hat-trick in a 3–1 win over second placed St Patrick's Athletic on 20 August 2021, taking him up to 5 goals for the season. Owolabi scored a total of 12 goals in 34 appearances in all competitions during his time with Finn Harps.

On 24 December 2021, Owolabi signed for League of Ireland Premier Division runners up, Dublin club St Patrick's Athletic, who had also just won the 2021 FAI Cup. On 11 February 2022, Owolabi made his debut for the club in the 2022 President of Ireland's Cup against Shamrock Rovers at Tallaght Stadium, scoring in the penalty shootout as his side lost 5–4 on penalties after a 1–1 draw. His first goal for Pat's came on 25 February 2022 when he came off the bench and pulled a goal back for his side 10 minutes later in a 2–1 defeat against Sligo Rovers at Richmond Park. On 23 May 2022, Owolabi scored a hat-trick in a 3–0 win over rivals Bohemians at Richmond Park. Owolabi made his first appearance in European football on 21 July 2022 in a 1–1 draw with Slovenian side NŠ Mura in the UEFA Europa Conference League.

On 10 December 2022, Owolabi signed for Cork City for the 2023 season.

Career statistics

References

1995 births
Living people
Belgian footballers
F.C. United of Manchester players
New Mills A.F.C. players
Hyde United F.C. players
Prescot Cables F.C. players
Stalybridge Celtic F.C. players
Glossop North End A.F.C. players
Skelmersdale United F.C. players
Radcliffe F.C. players
Victoria Hotspurs F.C. players
Hamilton Academical F.C. players
Finn Harps F.C. players
St Patrick's Athletic F.C. players
Cork City F.C. players
Northern Premier League players
Scottish Professional Football League players
Association football forwards
Belgian expatriate footballers
Belgian expatriate sportspeople in England
Expatriate footballers in England
Belgian expatriate sportspeople in Malta
Expatriate footballers in Malta
Belgian expatriate sportspeople in Scotland
Expatriate footballers in Scotland
Belgian expatriate sportspeople in Ireland
Expatriate association footballers in the Republic of Ireland
Belgian people of Nigerian descent
League of Ireland players
Royal Cappellen F.C. players
Black Belgian sportspeople